Appenweier is a municipality in western Baden-Württemberg, Germany in the district of Ortenau.

Geography 
Appenweier consists of the main municipal Appenweier (4,075 inhabitants), Urloffen (4,301 inhabitants), known for horseradish-growing, and Nesselried (1,383 inhabitants). The Nesselried district runs through the Wannenbach valley, while Urloffen lies north of Appenweier.

References

External links 

 Appenweier Web Page (in German)
 Appenweier history, places of interest, destination (in German)

Ortenaukreis